Revenue Agent is a 1950 American film directed by Lew Landers.

Plot
The accountant's wife is having an affair with his boss. In retribution the husband calls the Internal Revenue Service to expose a large tax evasion racket to smuggle gold bullion out of Mexico.

Cast
 Lyle Talbot as Augustis King - Accountant
 Jean Willes as Martha - Wife
 Onslow Stevens as Sam Bellows - Boss
 Douglas Kennedy as Steve Daniels - IRS agent
 Archie R. Twitchell as Ernie Medford

References

External links

1950 films
Columbia Pictures films
American crime drama films
1950 crime drama films
American black-and-white films
1950s English-language films
Films directed by Lew Landers
1950s American films